Venerable Macarius' Miracle of the Moose is a miracle associated with the name of
Venerable Macarius of the Yellow Water Lake and the Unzha (1349-1444),
a  Saint of the Russian Orthodox Church. It is thought to have occurred in June 1439 in the
woodlands of what today is Semyonov District of Nizhny Novgorod Oblast.

The account of the miracle in the Life of Venerable Macarius

During the invasion of Russia by the Khan Olug Moxammat
of Kazan in 1439, Zheltovodsky (Yellow Lake) Monastery of Holy Trinity 
was destroyed. Venerable Macarius (Makariy), the founder of the monastery, was taken prisoner 
along with a few other survivors. After meeting with Macarius, the khan was so 
impressed by the nonagenarian abbot's piety and love of his neighbor, 
that he released him and his disciples, on the condition that they leave the Yellow Lake site.

The Yellow Lake (which was located at the fall of the Kerzhenets into
the Volga) being too perilously close to the invasion route taken by the Kazan Khanate
armies invading Russian principalities and vice versa, the released survivors decided
to relocate a few hundred kilometers to the north, into the fastness of the Galich forests, 
which are located along the Unzha River in what today is Kostroma Oblast.
Taking the easy route along the Volga would not be a safe thing to do in this year of war; so
the Saint and his followers choose to travel through the dense woodlands and swamps of the 
Kerzhenets basin  — the land which is even today is almost deserted by people.

After a few days of travel, the monks ran out of food. One day they somehow managed
to capture a moose  (some later sources say that the moose had been trapped "at a narrow place", perhaps between trees). The followers of Macarius wanted to slaughter and eat the animal. But as this was
the time of the Fast of the Holy Apostles, Venerable Macarius prohibited
them to do that. Instead, he told them to cut off the moose's right ear and to release 
the animal. He told them that they only need to wait for three days, until the Feast of Saints Peter and Paul, and the moose will be theirs. "Don't be aggrieved", said Macarius, " but pray to the Lord. He who fed the people
of Israel in the desert with manna for 40 years, can also feed you these
days in a manner invisible. Have a strong faith in Him who fed five thousand
people, not counting women and children, with five loaves and two fish!"

For the next three days of the fast the travellers marched along without fatigue. No one
died of starvation; no one even felt hunger or thought of food.

On the Feast day of Holy Apostles Peter and Paul, Venerable Macarius went away from his 
companions and praised the Lord, praying to Him that His people may be fed as had been 
the people of Israel in the desert or the five thousand people in the days of Apostles.
When Macarius returned to his brethren, they saw the moose with no right ear approaching
them. And this time, the animal was not wild: it behaved as if it was tame.

After the dinner of bonfire-roasted venison, the travellers praised the Lord 
for His great kindness. Venerable Macarius told his companions not to worry about food
anymore, but rely on God Who will give them food and everything else they need.

The Life of Venerable Macarius does not tell us whether everyone who had left
the Yellow Lake with him reached the Unzha alive. But it is said that God had protected
them from hunger and from wild beasts during their travel, delivering moose, deer, and other game
into their hands.

Commemoration of the miracle

Liturgy
The Kontakion of the Hymn for the Feast of Venerable Macarius (July 25
Julian calendar) refers to this miracle when it says of Macarius:
"You were revealed as the second Moses, O Venerable One.
For he divided the sea with a staff,
You have conquered the passions like Amalek,
And you passed through the impassable wilderness with an unwavering mind,
And in it you performed great wonders through your prayers.
You abundantly fed the hungry people."

Iconography

The Miracle of the Moose appears on some of the icons of Venerable Macarius,
sometimes as the main topic of the icon, sometimes as one of the episodes. 
It is also the topic of one of the new frescoes 
in the Refectory section of the Ascension Cathedral of Pechersky Ascension Monastery
in Nizhny Novgorod

Olenevsky Skete
The Kerzhenets River woodlands, where the Miracle of the Moose purportedly happened, became in the late 17th century one of the main areas of refuge for the Old Believers. According to their legend, the main community of the Kerzhenets Old Believers, known as the Olenevsky Skete had been founded soon after the Miracle of the Moose by some of the monks expelled from Venerable Macarius' Yellow Waters Monastery, at the site where the animal was captured by the Venerable's prayers. The skete's name comes from the Russian  (olen), which means "deer", thus commemorating the miracle. It is said that during the Raskol two hundred years later the Skete's hermits rejected Nikon's reforms, thus making it the center of attraction for Old Believer refugees from other parts of the country, who then founded numerous other sketes in the area.

Olenevsky Skete was one of the centers of the so-called Beglopopovtsy ("those who accepted the fleeing priests"), the school of Old Believers who thought that, since the Old Believers had no bishops of their own who could ordain priest, it was acceptable for them to accept priests who had been ordained by the established church but later left it for the Old Believier sketes.  It is reported that the Skete was mostly destroyed during one of the Old Believer suppression campaigns in 1737, but restored after Catherine II's "amnesty" of 1762. It was known as a women's skete, with 49 nuns reported as living there at the time of its official closure in 1854, pursuant to Nicholas I anti-skete executive order of 1853.  A number of nuns in fact continued to live at the site long after the official disbandment.

The former skete is now known as the village of Bolshoye Olenevo, and is located 24 km south-east of the town of Semyonov (Nizhny Novgorod Oblast). It remains the site of pilgrimage for the Old Believers of the area.

References
The Life of Venerable Macarius, at the site of Pechersky Ascencion Monastery 

Iconography
Venerable Macarius' Miracle of the Moose, fresco at the Ascension Cathedral in Pechersky Ascension Monastery.
Venerable Macarius' Miracle with the Moose (Чудо преподобного Макария с лосем), first part (icon, Kotlovka Gallery)
Venerable Macarius' Miracle with the Moose (Чудо преподобного Макария с лосем), second part (icon, Kotlovka Gallery)
An icon of Venerable Macarius (at the Orthodox Calendar site). The Miracle of the Moose is shown as the bottom left episode.

Footnotes

Eastern Orthodoxy in medieval Russia
Culture of Nizhny Novgorod Oblast
1439 in Europe
15th-century Eastern Orthodoxy
15th-century Christianity
Moose
Christian miracles
Eastern Christian monasticism